The mountain spiny rat (Maxomys alticola) is a species of rodent in the family Muridae.
It is found only in Malaysia.

References

Maxomys
Endemic fauna of Malaysia
Rodents of Malaysia
Mammals described in 1888
Taxa named by Oldfield Thomas
Taxonomy articles created by Polbot